John Bardoe Elliott, (1785 – Aug. 26 1863) was a  civil servant in Colonial India. He is best known for his collection of oriental manuscripts that he donated to the Bodleian Library at the University of Oxford in 1859.

Early life
Elliott was born in 1785 in Ripon, Yorkshire, the son of John E. Elliott, a naval officer, and Isabella (Todd) Elliott.

India
Elliott travelled to India in 1800 and spent more than 50 years there. He served as a judge in Patna in 1822-28 then later as the resident there, retiring in 1845. He died in Patna on August 26th, 1863.

Collections 
Elliott acquired many of the manuscripts collected by Gore Ouseley. The Ouseley manuscripts were not kept separately by Elliott, so that provenance cannot be distinguished fully among the Oxford collections. The Elliott manuscripts are described in the catalogue published in 1889.

Research
Elliott was active as a researcher and published an article on a Buddhist inscription.

References

External links
  Weston Library, Bodleian Libraries, Oxford.
  FIHRIST : Union Catalogue of Manuscripts from the Islamicate World, Oxford University, Collection Oriental Manuscripts, Elliott Collection (date accessed :20/10/2020).

1785 births
1863 deaths
People from Ripon
British India judges
Indian Civil Service (British India) officers
British people in colonial India